Páll Ólafsson (born 1 May 1960) is an Icelandic former handball player who competed in the 1988 Summer Olympics. Before concentrating on handball, Páll had a promising football career; a midfielder, he was capped twice for the Iceland national football team and played for Þróttur Reykjavík.

References

External links
 

1960 births
Living people
Pall Olafsson
Pall Olafsson
Handball players at the 1988 Summer Olympics
Pall Olafsson
Association football midfielders
Pall Olafsson
Pall Olafsson